The Cascade River is a river in the U.S. state of Washington. It is a tributary of the Skagit River which it joins at the city of Marblemount. It is a National Wild and Scenic River.

South Fork 
The South Fork originates from South Cascade Lake and flows west briefly before turning north quickly and flowing in that direction until it converges with the Middle Fork to form the Cascade River Proper. About halfway between its source and its mouth the river flows through a gorge called Box Canyon.

Middle Fork 
The Middle Fork begins at the toe of the Middle Cascade Glacier. It flows briefly north, then west to join the South Fork, forming the Cascade River Proper. The river drops over Gemini Falls just above its mouth.

North Fork 
The North Fork originates at Cascade Pass, flows north briefly and then does a wide 180 degree turn until it reaches the Cascade River proper. It picks up several large glacier fed streams shortly below its source.

Cascade River proper 
Beginning at the confluence of the South and Middle Forks, the Cascade River flows north before turning west just before the North Fork enters then turning northwest. At the mouth of Marble Creek, the river turns west again until its confluence with the Skagit.

Tributaries 

South Fork
Salix Creek
High Log Creek
Drop Creek
Milt Creek
Pincer Creek

Middle Fork
Cleve Creek

North Fork
Soldier Boy Creek
Midas Creek
Morning Star Creek
Boston Creek
Gilbert Creek
Eldorado Creek
Roush Creek
Hidden Lake Creek

Mainstream
Barrett Creek
Sonny Boy Creek
Swamp Creek
Kindy Creek
Hard Creek
Found Creek
Sibley Creek
Marble Creek
Lookout Creek
Irene Creek
Day Creek
Boulder Creek
Clark Creek
Jordan Creek

See also 
List of Washington rivers
Waterfalls of the North Fork Cascade River Valley

References 

Rivers of Washington (state)
North Cascades of Washington (state)
Rivers of Skagit County, Washington
Wild and Scenic Rivers of the United States